Louhi is a wicked queen of the land known as Pohjola in Finnish mythology and a villain of the Kalevala. As many mythological creatures and objects are easily conflated and separated in Finnish mythology, Louhi is probably an alter-ego of the goddess Loviatar.

In mythology
Louhi is described as a powerful and evil witch queen ruling over the northern realm of Pohjola, with the ability to change shape and weave mighty enchantments. She is also the main opponent of Väinämöinen and his group in the battle for the magical artifact Sampo in the Kalevala. She has a number of beautiful daughters, whom Ilmarinen, Lemminkäinen and other heroes attempt to win in various legends. In true fairy tale form, Louhi sets them difficult-to-impossible tasks to perform in order to claim such a prize, which leads to the forging of the Sampo.

In popular culture
Louhi was the main antagonist in the Finnish-Soviet film Sampo, played by Anna Orochko. 
There is an orchestral work Louhi by the Finnish composer Kalevi Aho, and the wind orchestral work Louhi's Spells / Louhen loitsut by Finnish composer Tomi Räisänen. 
Louhi is track 5 on Kesto, recorded by Pan Sonic. 
Louhi was an inspiration for a foe of Conan the Barbarian's in the Marvel comics version of the character (no such foe ever appears in Howard's stories)
Final Fantasy: The 4 Heroes of Light features Louhi the Witch of the North as a boss, Final Fantasy XI features the item Louhi's Mask, and Final Fantasy XIV features Louhi as a powerful ice enemy.
Louhi is the main antagonist of Michael Scott Rohan's fantasy trilogy The Winter of the World. 
Louhi is also one of the names of the witch Iggwilv in the Dungeons & Dragons game's Greyhawk campaign by Gary Gygax. In his book Sea of Death, Iggwilv is mentioned as being called Louhi on an alternate Earth. Louhi is also mentioned in the supplement Deities & Demigods for the first edition of Advanced Dungeons & Dragons, as character part of the Finnish mythos. 
Louhikäärme – Louhi's snake – is an archaic form of lohikäärme meaning "dragon" in Finnish.

Gallery

See also
 Laufey, the mother of Loki in Norse mythology

References

External links
 Louhi (Finnish goddess) -- Britannica Online Encyclopedia

Characters in the Kalevala
Female villains
Finnish goddesses
Fictional characters who use magic
Fictional queens
Fictional shapeshifters
Karelian-Finnish folklore
Witchcraft in folklore and mythology